The 1906–07 Army Cadets men's basketball team represented United States Military Academy during the 1906–07 college men's basketball season. The head coach was Harry Fisher, coaching his first season with the cadets. The team captain was Lewis Rockwell.

Schedule

|-

References

Army Black Knights men's basketball seasons
Army
Army Cadets Men's Basketball Team
Army Cadets Men's Basketball Team